Anthony "Tony" Edward O'Donohue (March 22, 1933 – February 20, 2022) was a former municipal politician in Toronto, Ontario, Canada.

Early life
Born in The Burren, County Clare, Ireland (then Irish Free State), O'Donohue graduated as a civil engineer from University College, Galway in 1954. He moved to Toronto in 1956 to pursue his profession as a municipal engineer designing urban services such as roads, water supply, sewage treatment, storm water run-off and waste management.

Inspired by Prime Minister Lester B. Pearson's initiative for a new flag for Canada, O'Donohue joined the Young Liberals in the early 1960s and made many trips to Ottawa with other Young Liberals to support the new flag proposal. As one of the party's first advocates for environmental causes, he encouraged the Young Liberals to become active in environmental issues. His Liberal Party national convention papers on water supply and sewage treatment received national attention.

City Council
He was elected as a Toronto City Council alderman in the 1966 municipal election. As an engineer, he focused on the need for a clearer understanding of the environment and, as a reformer, encouraged a new approach to local politics. He ran for Toronto mayor in 1972, losing to David Crombie, and again in 1978 to John Sewell. His 1978 defeat to the left-wing Sewell was seen as a result of vote splitting between O'Donohue and David Smith, a Liberal.

O'Donohue and colleague Art Eggleton had agreed that only one of them should run against Sewell for mayor in 1980. They were to conduct a public opinion poll to determine which of them had the better chance of toppling the incumbent Mayor. However, according to O'Donohue's memoirs, Eggleton broke the pact and unilaterally declared himself a mayoralty candidate forcing O'Donohue to stay out of the race in order not to split the vote.

O'Donohue was returned to City Council following a by-election after the death of City Councillor George Ben in 1980. He spent the next 14 years working to address the many energy and environmental problems facing urban areas.

In April 1989, O'Donohue introduced a by-law at City Council to ban the manufacture, sale, distribution and use of ozone depleting substances. It was the first such legislation anywhere and became a model for other cities. As a result, he was invited to make a presentation on the Toronto by-law at the Beckman Institute of the National Academies of Science and Engineering, in Irvine, California. While there, he consulted world-renowned chemist and later Nobel laureate Frank Sherwood Rowland on how to help prevent the dumping of ozone depleting substances into the atmosphere.

In 1992, he presented a motion to City Council to adopt a by-law prohibiting anyone from lying, sleeping or blocking city sidewalks. He argued that the city paid millions of dollars to make sufficient beds available for the homeless and there was no need for anyone to lie or sleep on the sidewalks. The motion lost and sleeping on the sidewalks has remained part of the landscape in downtown Toronto streets.

In the 1994 municipal election, he was defeated in Ward 3 by 28-year-old Mario Silva. The result was very close and subject to several recounts before the Ontario Court of Appeal ruled that Silva had won by 15 votes.

After politics
Since leaving politics, O'Donohue operated his own company until 2004, Environmental Probe Ltd., which helped developers fulfil the requirements of environmental assessments and laws.

O'Donohue's son, Daniel, works for the city of Toronto as an evaluator of expropriated land.

Republicanism
An active supporter of replacing the British monarch with a Canadian head of state, he was a member of Citizens for a Canadian Republic, before founding Republic Now and joining its executive board.  O'Donohue made news in 2002 as a result of his legal challenge to the Act of Settlement barring Roman Catholics from the throne of Canada. He filed an application to the Ontario Superior Court, O'Donohue v. Her Majesty The Queen, calling on the court to strike down the discriminatory sections of the act as being in violation of the Canadian Charter of Rights and Freedoms. His case was dismissed in 2003 and his appeal was subsequently denied.

Toronto Atmospheric Fund
Following the Changing Atmosphere Conference in July, 1988, O’Donohue embarked a plan to make Toronto a leading world city in urban environmental issues. He convinced City Council to apply to the province for special legislation to set up the Toronto Atmospheric Fund (TAF). In December 1992, approval was given.

As a member of the City Executive Committee, O’Donohue convinced City Council that $23 million – 20%  of the moneys received by the City from the sale of its Jail Farm – should be given to TAF and he was appointed chairman.

See also
Monarchy in Canada
Canadian republicanism

References

Works
 Front Row Centre (2000) Abbeyfield Publishers. 
 The Tale of a City - Re-Engineering the Urban Environment (2005) Dundurn Press.

External links

1933 births
Living people
Irish emigrants to Canada
Toronto city councillors
Canadian Roman Catholics
Canadian republicans
Politicians from County Clare